The Battle of Arlabán, also known as the First Surprise of Arlabán, took place at the heights of Arlabán, the mountain pass that separates the Basque provinces of Guipúzcoa and Álava, on 25 May 1811, during the Peninsular War.

Battle
At eight o'clock in the morning, a Spanish guerrilla force numbering between 3,000 and 4,500 men, led by Francisco Espoz y Mina, ambushed and captured the central part of a convoy made up of 150 wagons and 1,050 prisoners, escorted by 1,600 French troops led by Colonel Laffitte and spread out over 5 km. Seven hours later, the French finally surrendered. The Spanish captured a variety of supplies and weapons (the convoy was valued at 4 million reales), and 1,042 British, Portuguese and Spanish prisoners were released. The convoy became known as the convoy de los Ingleses because most of the prisoners were British.

Aided by local guerrilla groups that knew the terrain well, Espoz y Mina had positioned his guerrilleros on both sides of the pass, on the route to France, some 20 km north of Vitoria, at four o'clock in the morning.

Aftermath
This was the last action that Espoz y Mina led as a guerrilla leader in Navarre. On 5 June, his forces, the División de Navarra, were integrated into the regular Army of Spain, but he would continue to lead his troops into battle against the French, including at the Second Surprise of Arlabán, on 9 April 1812.

Notes

References

Further reading

External links
 

Battles of the Peninsular War
Battles of the Napoleonic Wars
Battles involving France
Battles involving Spain
Battles in the Basque Country (autonomous community)
May 1811 events
1811 in Spain